Ulyanov, or Ulyanova (feminine; Улья́нова) is a common Russian last name and may refer to several people:

Alexander Ulyanov (1866–1887), Russian revolutionary, Vladimir Lenin's brother
Anatoliy Ulyanov (b. 1998), Ukrainian footballer
Anna Ulyanova (1864–1935), Russian revolutionary, Vladimir Lenin's sister
Boris Ulyanov (1891–1951), Russian tennis player
Dmitri Ilyich Ulyanov (1874–1943), Russian revolutionary, Vladimir Lenin's brother
Dmitri Nikolayevich Ulyanov (b. 1970), Soviet and Russian footballer
Dmytro Ulyanov (b. 1993), Ukrainian footballer
Grigory Ulyanov (1859–1912), Russian linguist
Ilya Ulyanov (1831–1886), Russian public figure in the field of public education and a teacher, Vladimir Lenin's father
Ivan Ulyanov (1884–1946), Russian revolutionary
Maria Alexandrovna Ulyanova (1835–1916), Vladimir Lenin's mother
Maria Ilyinichna Ulyanova (1878–1937), Vladimir Lenin's sister
Mikhail Ulyanov (1927–2007), Soviet actor
Mikhail Ivanovich Ulyanov (b. 1953), Russian diplomat
Nikolai Ulyanov (1875–1949), Russian painter and graphic artist
Olga Ilyinichna Ulyanova (1871–1891), Vladimir Lenin's sister
Olga Ulyanova (1922-2011), Vladimir Lenin's niece
Petr Lavrentyevich Ulyanov, (1928-2006), Mathematician
Vitaly Ulyanov (1925-?), Soviet soldier and Hero of the Soviet Union
Vladimir Ulyanov (Lenin) (1870–1924)
Vladimir Ulyanov (officer) (1965–2003), Russian army officer and Hero of Russia

See also
Ulyanovsky (disambiguation)
Ulyanovsk